The British V-class submarine (officially "U-Class Long hull 1941–42 programme") was a class of submarines built for the Royal Navy during the Second World War.

History
Forty-two vessels were ordered to this design, all to be built by Vickers-Armstrong at either Barrow-in-Furness or at Walker-on-Tyne, but only 22 were completed. Note that seven of these vessels received 'U' names (conversely, four of the U class had received names beginning with 'V').

The V-class submarines were very similar to the preceding U-class (short-hull) boats, of which they constituted a linear development, but had 3/4-inch pressure hull plating instead of 1/2-inch for deeper diving, also a lengthened stern and fining at the bows to reduce noise and improve underwater handling.

They were sometimes referred to as Vampire-class submarines after .

It was one of this class, that would go down in history as the only submarine to sink another submarine while submerged - that submarine was the German .

Ships
The vessels which were ordered are shown below in their programme order (not all completed construction):

The first eight vessels were ordered on 5 December 1941 under that year's programme.
 
 
 , completed as Pipinos (Y8)
 
 
 
 
 

The next eighteen vessels were ordered on 21 May 1942 under that year's programme, but six of these were cancelled in early 1944.
 
 
 
 
 
 
 , completed as 
 , completed as HNoMS Utsira
 , transferred to Greece in 1945 as 
 , completed as 
cancelled
 HMS Veto (P88), cancelled 23 January 1944 and scrapped on the slip
 HMS Virile (P89), cancelled 23 January 1944 and scrapped on the slip
 HMS Visitant (P91), cancelled 23 January 1944 (never laid down)
 HMS Upas (P92), cancelled February 1944 and scrapped on the slip
 HMS Ulex (P93), cancelled February 1944 (never laid down)
 HMS Utopia (P94), cancelled February 1944 (never laid down)
 
 

A further six vessels were ordered on 17 November 1942 under the same year's programme, but four of these were cancelled on 23 January 1944.
 
 
cancelled
 HMS Vantage, cancelled 23 January 1944 (never laid down)
 HMS Vehement (P25), cancelled 23 January 1944 (never laid down)
 HMS Venom (P27), cancelled 23 January 1944 (never laid down)
 HMS Verve (P28), cancelled 23 January 1944 (never laid down)

Finally, a further ten vessels were ordered under the 1943 Programme, but all of these were cancelled on 20 November 1943; eight of these were never given names.
cancelled
 HMS Unbridled (P11), cancelled 20 November 1943 (never laid down)
 HMS Upward (P16), cancelled 20 November 1943 (never laid down)
 Eight more unnamed boats

Notes

References

 Allied Warships – Submarine – V Class
 

 
V